Deepcar is a village located on the eastern fringe of the town of Stocksbridge, South Yorkshire, England. It is in the electoral ward of Stocksbridge and Upper Don,  approximately north-west of Sheffield city centre.

Geography 
The village lies south-west of the confluence of the River Don and Little Don River, and near to the junctions of the A616 road and A6102 roads, and the former junction of the 'Woodhead Line' (Sheffield to Penistone section, built for the Sheffield, Ashton-under-Lyne and Manchester Railway) and private Stocksbridge Railways; the village was served by the Deepcar railway station from 1846 to 1959.

History 
The Deepcar archaeological site, which included a structure or 'house', dating to the mesolithic period, and ascribed to the Maglemosian culture was excavated in 1962 close to the junction of the Don and Little Don at Wharncliffe Wood..   The site's culture has similarities to Star Carr in North Yorkshire, but gives its name to unique "Deepcar type assemblages" of microliths in the archaeology literature.

A potential Romano-British settlement has also been identified near the river banks.

The parish church of St John the Evangelist was opened in 1878.

See also
Listed buildings in Stocksbridge

References

External links

 Sources for the history of Deepcar Produced by Sheffield City Council's Libraries and Archives

Villages of the metropolitan borough of Sheffield
Villages in South Yorkshire
Towns and villages of the Peak District
Archaeological sites in South Yorkshire
Stocksbridge